Bon Secours Wellness Arena (formerly the BI-LO Center; The Well) is a multi-purpose arena in Greenville, South Carolina. The arena serves as the home of the Greenville Swamp Rabbits of the ECHL.

History
The Bon Secours Wellness Arena was built in 1998 at a cost of US $63 million, under its former name of BI-LO Center, to replace Greenville's outdated and under-repaired Greenville Memorial Auditorium, which was imploded on September 20, 1997, on a site located across the street from the new arena. The arena naming rights were purchased by Dutch grocer Ahold, then-owner of BI-LO, which had been founded in nearby Mauldin and was still based there at the time. When it was built, it passed Columbia's Carolina Coliseum as the largest arena in the state of South Carolina, a distinction it held until 2002, when the Carolina Center was built in Columbia.

On September 18, 2013, the BI-LO Center was officially renamed the Bon Secours Wellness Arena after the Bon Secours Health System purchased the naming rights.

Seating capacity
As a concert venue, the Bon Secours Wellness Arena can seat approximately 19,000 spectators, depending on the positioning of the stage. In addition, the arena features 30 luxury suites and 840 club seats.

Notable events
The arena has hosted a variety of events such as professional wrestling, monster truck rallies, ice dancing shows and competitions, and concerts spanning many different musical genres.

Concerts
During an average year, The Well hosts 20–25 concerts spanning across all music genres and related artists. Notable concerts include The Eagles, Garth Brooks, Luke Bryan, Pearl Jam, Eric Church, Bon Jovi, and many more.

The BI-LO Center opened with Janet Jackson in 1998 (24 years ago) and followed in the same year with Pearl Jam, and later, Rob Zombie with Korn; Jay-Z in 1999; Backstreet Boys, Britney Spears, Creed, Red Hot Chili Peppers with Foo Fighters, Ricky Martin, NSYNC, Limp Bizkit with Godsmack, Eminem with DMX (who once lived in Greenville) in 2000; Fuel with Buckcherry, Dave Matthews Band in 2001; and Puddle of Mudd, and Tool in 2002. Jars of Clay performed there in 2007 for their Christmas Offerings Tour. Twenty One Pilots played here on October 11, 2019, for The Bandito Tour.

Family events 
The arena also hosts a number of family events such as Disney on Ice, Monster Jam, WWE Raw, and Harlem Globetrotters.

Sporting events 
The arena has served as the home of multiple professional and semi-professional teams. From 2001 to 2003, the arena served as the home for the Greenville Groove, one of the original members of the National Basketball Development League.

It hosted the Carolina Rhinos football team, one of the inaugural members of AF2, from 2000 to 2002.

Beginning in 1998, the arena hosted the Greenville Grrrowl, an ECHL team. The team won the Kelly Cup in 2002 during that time.

On February 14, 2010, the ECHL team Johnstown Chiefs announced that it would be moving from Johnstown, PA to Greenville, SC following the 2010 season. The Johnstown Chiefs became began in Greenville as the Greenville Road Warriors. In 2015, the team was renamed to the Greenville Swamp Rabbits.

The Impact Wrestling pay-per-view, Against All Odds 2008 was also held at the Arena on February 10, 2008.

On June 22, 2019, UFC Fight Night: Moicano vs. The Korean Zombie was held at the venue, this was its first event in South Carolina.

Basketball 
The arena hosted the Southern Conference Men's Basketball Tournament in 2000 and 2001, as well as first and second-round games during the 2002 NCAA Division I men's basketball tournament. In September 2016, the NCAA announced that it would move all tournament games scheduled to take place in North Carolina during the 2016–2017 academic year, due to North Carolina's controversial House Bill 2. Therefore, on March 17 and 19, 2017, the Bon Secours Wellness Arena hosted the first and second-round games for the 2017 NCAA men's basketball tournament, originally intended to take place at the Greensboro Coliseum Complex in Greensboro, North Carolina. This was the first NCAA postseason basketball event to have been held at the arena since 2002. The arena also hosted first and second-round NCAA men's tournament games in 2022.

In 2005, the SEC Women's Basketball Tournament was played at the Bon Secours Wellness Arena following a scheduling conflict with the intended host site, Philips Arena. Logistically, Philips Arena could not hold the 2005 SEC Women's Basketball Tournament just six weeks after the 54th NHL All-Star Game. Even with the 2004–2005 NHL Lockout, the SEC chose to keep the tournament in Greenville. The SEC Women's Tournament returned to Greenville in March 2017. In October 2017, it was announced that Bon Secours would host the SEC Women's Basketball Tournament for three consecutive years, starting with the 2019 tournament. In 2023, the SEC Women's Basketball Tournament returns annually to the arena for three consecutive years.

On October 10, 2014, the Bon Secours Wellness Arena hosted an NBA preseason game between the Washington Wizards and Charlotte Hornets.

Due to the significant renovation planned for Clemson University's Littlejohn Coliseum, the Clemson Tigers Men's and Women's Basketball Teams played their home games for the 2015–2016 season at the Bon Secours Wellness Arena.

References

External links

 

Sports venues completed in 1998
Buildings and structures in Greenville, South Carolina
Greenville Groove
Ice hockey venues in South Carolina
Indoor ice hockey venues in the United States
Defunct NBA G League venues
Sports venues in Greenville, South Carolina
Indoor arenas in South Carolina